Maneel is a small village 10 km from the main bazaar of Kotli, Azad Kashmir, Pakistan.

Populated places in Kotli District